Thomas Gilbert (1714-1797) was a soldier in King George's War, the French and Indian War and the American Revolution. He was known as the "Leader of the New England Tories."  He became a Loyalist, originally from Assonet in Freetown, Massachusetts, he settled a community that was eventually named after him, Gilberts Cove, Nova Scotia.

During King George's War, he fought in the Siege of Louisbourg (1745).  During the French and Indian War, he also fought at the Battle of Lake George as Lieutenant-Colonel under Brigadier-General Timothy Ruggles afterwards of Wilmot, Nova Scotia (Upper Granville, Nova Scotia), at Crown Point in 1755.  Gilbert became commander of the forces under Colonel Ephraim Williams when the latter was killed in the same year at Lake George.

During the American Revolution, Gilbert and his three sons fought for the British in Massachusetts.  In May 1783 they were exiled to Nova Scotia along with their slaves. They settled in the community that became known as Gilberts Cove, Nova Scotia.  They later moved to Saint John River (New Brunswick).

See also 
Nova Scotia in the American Revolution

References 

 John C. Crane. Col Thomas Gilbert: The Leader of New England Tories. Worcester, Mass, E. V. Newton Publisher. 1893.

People from Digby County, Nova Scotia
Loyalists who settled Nova Scotia
1715 births
1797 deaths
People from Assonet, Massachusetts